The Lake Jesuit (popularly designated "Little Long Lake") is located in the Lejeune Township, in the municipality of Sainte-Thècle, in the Mékinac Regional County Municipality in the Batiscanie, in the administrative region of Mauricie in the province of Quebec, in Canada. The forestry sector has marked the economy. Today, tourist activities, especially the resort, are increasing rapidly. An important hamlet of chalets is located around the northern part of the lake. While several cottages on the south side are accessible only by water or mountain biking, but they are accessible in winter on the ice.

Geography 

The maximum depth of the lake is the Jesuit .

This second lake has three large bays and an island.

Roads surrounding

By road, the northern part of the lake is reachable by bypassing the mountains from the west, from the mouth of the lake, just follow the path of the Jesuit Lake (west), the road Lejeune Township (passing near Chnabail lakes) to route Joseph Saint-Amand where you have to turn right (heading north) and spend almost three lakes Champlain. Because of the mountains, there is no waggon road on the east side of the southern part of the lake to the Baptist lakes, three lakes Grandbois, lakes of the Center and Lake one mile. However, the "chemin des érables" (from the route Joseph Saint-Amand and southbound) serves the northern part of the lake (east side), up to a large bay. While the "chemin des cèdres" is serving west side of the northern part of the lake.

Location 

In 1933 and 1945, a total of 17,000 brook trout fry were stocked. In 1970, only 4 species of fish were living in the lake.

The dam at the mouth of Lake Jesuit is located at the southeast end (geographic coordinates: latitude 46.842558856° and longitude −72.541008842°). The latter lake is 191 meters above sea level and is 8 m. less than the lake Jesuit. The route of the lake outlet Jesuit resumes east of Lake Aylwin  to empty into the lake from the Traverse. At 940 m before it end, the "Décharge du lac Jésuite" (outlet of Lake Jesuit) receives the right shore waters "Ruisseau de l'Aqueduc" (Brook of Aqueduct) (approximate length: 850 m) which drains water from "Lac de l'Aqueduc" (Lake Aqueduct) (length of 320 m.) whose elevation is 303 m.
 
In the southern part of Lake Jesuit (the East and West sides) high cliffs plunge into the lake. The top of the mountain that faces the mouth reaches 385 m. Boutet Lake is located behind this mountain at 341 feet above sea level. These cliffs are known for climbing enthusiasts. For water lovers, boat launch for boats, is located close to the mouth, south of the lake, on the way-du-du-lac-Jesuit.

History 

Its form and extent, Lake Jesuit was an important route in the history of forestry to access licensed territories for logging and timber transport.

The company Veillet & Brothers Limited operated a sawmill (two floors) powered by steam at the southern end of the lake near the outlet. The mill was built in the summer of 1938 by workers under the direction of entrepreneurs Jeffrey Veillet and Freddy Veillet on a lot of Philorum Béland. The equipment of the mill came from the demolition of the sawmill and Veillet Brothers Limited located at Audy (Lac-aux-Sables). The first slaughter of hardwoods in this area (especially in the north of the lake) took place in the winter 1938-1939 to be sawn at the mill in the spring. The wood was transported on the lake with a boat boom driven by steam.

In 1945, Jeffrey Veillet sold his share of the mill to his brother Freddy Veillet who continued operations until his death occurred in 1949. Arsène Abel, son of Freddy Veillet sold the sawmill to 1952-1953, with all the equipment to a company that subsequently demolished the mill. Generally, about 25 to 30 employees were working at the same time at the mill.

Toponymy 

Lakes Le Jeune and Jesuit in the territory of Lejeune Township, referred to highlight the work of the Jesuit missionary life Paul Le Jeune (1591-1664) in New France. This gazetteer recognition extends northeast with Missionary Lake. The Geographic Board, became the Commission de toponymie du Québec (Geographical Names Board of Québec), adopted the place name "Lake Jesuit" in 1936, replacing the usual place name "Little Long Lake". The name "Lake Jesuit" was formalized as of December 5, 1968, at the "Bank of place names" of Commission de toponymie du Québec.

See also 
 Paul Le Jeune, founder of Trois-Rivières in 1634 and Montreal in 1642, and an explorer of the New France
 Rivière des Envies
 Batiscanie
 Missionary Lake
 Le Jeune Lake
 Lake Traverse (Mékinac)
 Sainte-Thècle
 Mekinac Regional County Municipality
 Lejeune Township

Notes and references

External links
 Municipality of Sainte-Thècle: 
 Promotion Sainte-Thècle: 
 Solidarity Cooperative Health Sainte-Thècle (Coopérative de Solidarité Santé de Sainte-Thècle): 
 Maps of Sainte-Thècle 
 Missionary Paul Le Jeune who is associated to a few related geographic names in Sainte-Thècle: Jesuit Lake, Le Jeune Lake, "Canton Le Jeune" Road, Canton (Township) Le Jeune; and in Lac-aux-Sables (Hervey-Jonction sector), with "Lac du missionnaire" (Missionary Lake).

Mékinac Regional County Municipality
Lakes of Mauricie